Dominion: Storm Over Gift 3 is a military science fiction real-time strategy video game developed by Ion Storm, published by Eidos Interactive, and released for Microsoft Windows in 1998. The game was originally developed as a spin-off of the mech simulation game G-Nome by 7th Level. Ion Storm acquired both Dominion and its lead designer, Todd Porter, from 7th Level for completion.

Production

Dominion was first developed by Todd Porter and Jerry O'Flaherty's company Distant Thunder, which was sold to 7th Level in February 1995. Distant Thunder made G-Nome which 7th Level published in 1996, which sold poorly and was met with mixed reviews. Porter and O'Flaherty started Dominion, a spinoff of G-Nome at 7th level before leaving, and John Romero hired them to start Ion Storm. Porter wished to make the game Doppelganger at Ion Storm, but heard that 7th Level had Dominion up for sale in 1997 because it was leaving the industry. Ion Storm unanimously voted in August 1997 to buy Dominion for $1.8m dollars from 7th Level, to "burn" one of the six game "options" that Ion Storm had contracted with Eidos, as part of a royalty deal, but Porter thought the game was "a top-10 product" that could sell 500,000 copies. It was renamed Dominion Storm and later Dominion: Storm Over Gift 3. Porter told Ion Storm the game would take six weeks to finish but hired an expensive full-time team out of ex-7th Level people.

The game employs a voxel-based graphics engine.

In October 1997 other top members of Ion Storm thought of firing Porter because the game was running over schedule and budget, but Romero vetoed it. The team hoped to make it for under $3 million, but it had cost more than that by December 1997, six months before release. Porter became CEO of Ion Storm and the Dallas Observer said "He turned down a deal with Compaq computers that would have paid ION 75 cents to $1 for every Compaq computer sold with Dominion preinstalled, and would have guaranteed Ion a minimum of $1.5 million." Porter said that RTS games in 1997 "were a pretty disappointing lot" besides Age of Empires, since they "didn’t really feel much like the old real-time strategy", but he thought Dominion was more like oldschool games in the genre. The game was designed to have a simple interface because Porter thought that RTS games had gotten too complex, and Porter said that the interface would probably be borrowed by other games. It was released as Ion Storm's debut title in June 1998, to poor sales - with possibly less than 24,000 copies sold in four months.

Plot

The game takes place on the fictitious planet of Gift 3 where war has broken out between four different races: the Scorps, Darkens, Mercs and Humans. The setting is shared with G-Nome.

Gameplay
One aspect of the design of the game is that the races are not "equal": Darken forces are sturdier, but are slower to build; Scorp forces cost much less to manufacture, but are weaker than the other races; Merc soldiers are more difficult to control, but are more accurate when firing; and the Humans are a balance of all features.  In addition, each race also gets one weapon type unique unto itself: Darken has a "cloaker" vehicle - which renders other vehicles invisible; the Mercs have the Widow Maker, which converts enemy towers and tanks into allies; the Humans have the M-Cat, which freezes any opponents' machinery from firing; and the Scorps have a Digger - an underground transport to deliver up to six men anywhere visible on the playing field.  Each of these vehicles are extremely fragile - an infantryman with a rifle can destroy it in one shot if not well protected.

There are a set of twelve missions (a campaign) for each of the races, where the computer opponent has the next level up in armaments, men or machines.  For instance, when the player has light infantry and machine gun towers, then the computer opponent will have bazookamen and rocket towers.  There is a list of objectives to complete a mission, some requires the performing of certain tasks, such as recapture a fallen base or rescue a leader from prison, others to merely wipe out the opponent completely.

Multiplayer
There is a full eight player multiplayer mode that can be hosted for other players. There are four built-in connection types, serial, modem, IPX and TCP/IP for direct play. Like other real-time strategy games the multiplayer options can be set to have high or low resources and slow to fast speed. MPlayer.com was launched with Dominion and installed from the start.

Soundtrack
Dominion features an electronic soundtrack by Will Loconto; the tracks vary between dark spacey atmospheres and classic 90s style video-game-themed techno/electro.

Reception

The game received mixed reviews according to the review aggregation website GameRankings. Next Generation said that the game "should have shipped in a plain white box with 'Realtime Strategy Game' stamped on it."

The game sold poorly upon release. The Dallas Observer reported that "Dominion averaged 7,000 copies per month in the first four months it was on the shelves." In the United States, market tracking firm PC Data reported that its sales reached 9,952 units by the end of August 1998, for revenues of $367,600. This number rose to 14,000 units by November 30, 1998, which drew a total of $466,600 in revenue. GameSpy later declared Ion Storm's handling of the game one of the "25 Dumbest Moments in Gaming", noting that the game likely sold less than 10,000 copies. 

The game was a runner-up for Computer Gaming Worlds 1998 "Coaster of the Year" award, which ultimately went to Jurassic Park: Trespasser. The staff wrote, "Ion Storm's initial release sailed like a lead balloon, complete with overhyped and ineffectual AI, 1995-era graphics, and a back story so bad that it had us wondering why we even briefly stopped playing StarCraft for this."

References

External links
 

1998 video games
Eidos Interactive games
Ion Storm games
Real-time strategy video games
Video game spin-offs
Video games developed in the United States
Video games with isometric graphics
Windows games
Windows-only games
Multiplayer and single-player video games
7th Level games